Richard Salvatore Castellano (September 4, 1933 – December 10, 1988) was an American actor who is best remembered for his role in Lovers and Other Strangers and his subsequent role as Peter Clemenza in The Godfather.

Early life
Castellano was born in the Queens borough of New York City on September 4, 1933. His parents, Mariantonia Angello and Filippo Castellano, were Italian immigrants from Castrofilippo, Sicily. His middle name, Salvatore, was in honor of his oldest brother who had died two years before he was born.

After his death, Castellano's widow Ardell Sheridan claimed that he was the nephew of Gambino crime family boss Paul Castellano, however this claim was dismissed by Richard's sister as false: "We're no relation".

Career
Castellano gained worldwide fame for his role in Lovers and Other Strangers (1970), for which he was nominated for an Academy Award. He achieved further stardom in 1972 for playing the part of Peter Clemenza, in The Godfather. The Godfather became the highest-grossing film up to that time.  Castellano, along with several other cast members, became widely known from the popular film. He spoke one of the film's most famous lines, "Leave the gun; take the cannoli," which he partially ad-libbed.

Castellano also appeared on television, playing the lead role of Joe Girelli in the television situation comedy The Super (10 episodes in 1972). His real-life daughter Margaret Castellano portrayed his character's daughter Joanne. He also portrayed the lead Joe Vitale in Joe and Sons (1975–1976).

Castellano did not reprise his role as Clemenza in The Godfather Part II (1974). He was reportedly excluded because Castellano and his agent insisted on having control over the character's dialogue. Director Francis Ford Coppola said that this was untenable, and wrote Castellano's Clemenza out of the movie, creating the new character Frank Pentangeli (played by Michael V. Gazzo) in his place.  This account was disputed by Castellanos widow in a 1991 letter to People magazine. Castellano said he did not have a part in the sequel because he did not believe that the character of Clemenza should become a traitor. He had other disagreements with Coppola, including confusion over how much weight he was expected to gain for the role. Bruno Kirby portrayed Clemenza as a young man in The Godfather Part II. He had played the son of Castellano's character in The Super.

Death
Castellano died from a heart attack at his home in North Bergen, New Jersey, in 1988 at age 55.

Filmography

References

External links

1933 births
1988 deaths
American male film actors
American male television actors
American male stage actors
Male actors from New York City
American people of Italian descent
20th-century American male actors
People from the Bronx
People from North Bergen, New Jersey